The FIBA Oceania Championship for Women 2005 was the qualifying tournament of FIBA Oceania for the 2006 FIBA World Championship for Women.
and Auckland. Australia won all three games.  Both teams qualified for the 2006 FIBA World Championship for Women.

Results

References

FIBA Oceania Championship for Women
Championship
2005 in New Zealand basketball
2005–06 in Australian basketball
International basketball competitions hosted by New Zealand
Australia women's national basketball team games
New Zealand women's national basketball team games
basketball